Tshepiso Ndwandwa (born 6 April 1996) is a South African cricketer. He made his Twenty20 debut for South Western Districts in the 2018 Africa T20 Cup on 14 September 2018. He made his List A debut on 6 October 2019, for South Western Districts in the 2019–20 CSA Provincial One-Day Challenge.

References

External links
 

1996 births
Living people
South African cricketers
South Western Districts cricketers
Place of birth missing (living people)